The 1960s generation, 60s generation, generation of '60s, Sixties' generation, etc. may refer to the following generations associated with the decade of 1960s:

Counterculture of the 1960s
Flower power generation of the 1960s
The Sexual revolution of the 1960s, also called the "Love Generation"
New Left generation of the 1960s
The New Wave (science fiction) is sometimes referred to as "the 60s generation of science fiction writers"
60s generation (Soviet Union)
Baby boomers, who had a massive impact on the culture of the 1960s
Generation X, whose birth years begin around the early-mid 1960s